Wadie Haddad ( 1927 – 28 March 1978), also known as Abu Hani, was a Palestinian leader of the Popular Front for the Liberation of Palestine's armed wing. He was responsible for organizing several civilian airplane hijackings in support of the Palestinian cause in the 1960s and 1970s, the most infamous of which being the Entebbe plane hijacking, during which militants under his command took 106 hostages.

Early years and education
Haddad was born to Palestinian Christian (Greek Orthodox) parents in Safed, Palestine, in 1927. During the 1948 Arab–Israeli War his family's home was destroyed and his family fled to Lebanon. He studied medicine at the American University of Beirut, where he met fellow Palestinian refugee, George Habash, who was also a medical student. Together they helped found the Arab Nationalist Movement (ANM), a pan-Arabist and Arab socialist group aiming to create the State of Palestine and unite the Arab countries.

After graduating, he relocated with Habash (a pediatrician) to Amman, Jordan, where they established a clinic. He worked with the United Nations Relief and Works Agency for Palestine Refugees (UNRWA) in 1956, but due to his Palestinian nationalist activism he was arrested by the Jordanian authorities in 1957. In 1961, he managed to escape to Syria. Haddad argued for armed struggle against Israel from 1963 onwards, and succeeded in militarizing the ANM.

Role in PFLP
After the 1967 Six-Day War, the Palestinian wing of the ANM transformed into the Popular Front for the Liberation of Palestine (PFLP), a Marxist formation, under the leadership of Habash. Haddad became the leader of the military wing of the group, involved in organizing attacks on Israeli targets. He helped plan the first PFLP aircraft hijacking in 1968, when an Israeli El Al plane was hijacked. He argued for and organized hijackings, despite criticism against the PFLP from within the Palestine Liberation Organization (PLO).

The Dawson's Field hijackings of 1970, when PFLP members including Leila Khaled brought three passenger jets to Jordan, helped provoke the bloody fighting of Black September. After the expulsion of the PLO factions from Jordan, Haddad was subjected to harsh criticism from the PFLP, which was in turn under pressure from the rest of the PLO. Haddad was ordered not to attack targets outside of Israel, but he continued operations under the name of Popular Front for the Liberation of Palestine – External Operations (PFLP-EO). Haddad was expelled from the organization PFLP in 1973.

He also employed the services of Ilich Ramírez Sánchez, better known as "Carlos the Jackal", whom he had met in 1970 and trained in guerrilla warfare techniques. Haddad decided to expel Sánchez from his team after Sánchez had been accused of refusing to kill two hostages, and possibly stealing ransom money, following the 1975 assault on the OPEC conference in Vienna. Haddad organized the Entebbe hijacking in June 1976.

Death
Haddad died on 28 March 1978 in East Germany, reportedly from leukemia. According to the book Striking Back, published by Aaron J. Klein in 2006, Haddad was killed by Mossad, which had sent the chocolate-loving Haddad Belgian chocolates coated with a slow-acting and undetectable poison which caused him to die several months later.

According to the 2018 book Rise and Kill First: The Secret History of Israel's Targeted Assassinations by Ronen Bergman, the Mossad killed Haddad by poisoning his toothpaste. On 10 January 1978, a deep-cover Mossad agent with a high level of access to Haddad's home and office switched his regular tube of toothpaste for an identical tube containing a toxin that had been developed at the Israel Institute for Biological Research. Some of the toxin penetrated the mucus membranes of his mouth and entered his bloodstream every time he brushed his teeth. Haddad became ill and was admitted to an Iraqi government hospital, where the doctors could not figure out what his condition was and suspected he had been poisoned. Upon Arafat's request, he was flown to East Germany to be hospitalized at a prestigious hospital which treated members of the intelligence and security commununities, where he was admitted under the pseudonym of Ahmed Doukli. The tube of lethal toothpaste 
was included in a bag of toiletries his aides packed for him when he was taken to East Germany. He was extensively tested and the physicians suspected he had been poisoned with either rat poison or thallium, but found no direct evidence. His condition contiuned to deteriorate. According to intelligence provided by an Israeli agent in East Germany, Haddad's screams of pain were heard throughout the hospital and he had to be heavily dosed with tranquilizers and sedatives. Haddad died ten days after his arrival there.

What remained of the PFLP-EO dissolved after his death, but in the process inaugurated the 15 May Organization and the PFLP-SC.

KGB agent
According to Vasili Mitrokhin, a senior KGB archivist who defected to the UK in 1992, in early 1970 Haddad was recruited by the KGB as an agent, codenamed NATIONALIST. Thereafter, in deep secrecy the Soviets helped to fund and arm the PFLP. The KGB had warning of its major operations and almost certainly sanctioned the most significant, such as the September 1970 hijackings. Haddad remained a highly valued agent till his death in 1978.

A letter by KGB chairman Yuri Andropov to Leonid Brezhnev, the Soviet leader and head of the Communist Party, about the covert transfer of arms to the PFLP refers to Haddad as a "trusted KGB intelligence agent". The letter and two other highly classified documents from the CPSU Central Committee archive were located and secretly copied by Vladimir Bukovsky in 1992.

Further reading 
Bassam Abu Sharif and Uzi Mahnaimi. The Best of Enemies: The Memoirs of Bassam Abu-Sharif and Uzi Mahnaimi, 1995. .

References

1927 births
1978 deaths
1978 murders in Germany
1970s murders in Berlin
20th-century Palestinian physicians
Arab Nationalist Movement
Assassinated Palestinian politicians
Deaths by poisoning
Eastern Orthodox Christians from Palestine
Operation Entebbe
Palestinian Arab nationalists
Palestinian Christian socialists
Palestinian militants
Palestinian nationalists
Palestinian people murdered abroad
People from Safed
People murdered in Berlin
People of the KGB
Popular Front for the Liberation of Palestine members